The initialism IPV may refer to:

Medicine 
 Inactivated poliovirus vaccine
 Intrapulmonary percussive ventilator
 Infectious pustular vulvovaginitis

Violence 
 Interpersonal violence
 Intimate partner violence, a form of domestic violence

Other 
 Internet Protocol Version
 Investigación y Proyectos de Vehículos Especiales, a Spanish brand of trucks
 Polytechnic Institute of Viseu, Portugal